The 1908 Clovis City Hall and Fire Station at 308 Pile St. in Clovis in Curry County, New Mexico was the first city hall and fire station in the city;  it served in that role from 1908 until 1929, and later served as an auto repair shop then as a hotel.  It was listed on the National Register of Historic Places in 1987.

It is a two-story Early Commercial-style brick building.

References

Fire stations on the National Register of Historic Places in New Mexico
National Register of Historic Places in Curry County, New Mexico
Early Commercial architecture in the United States
Fire stations completed in 1908
Clovis, New Mexico
City halls in New Mexico